St John the Baptist Clontarf may refer to parishes and church buildings in the district of Clontarf, Dublin, Ireland:

 Clontarf parish (Church of Ireland)
 The former Parish Church, near Clontarf Castle
 The current Parish Church, at Seafield Road
 Clontarf parish (Roman Catholic) 
 St John's parish, Clontarf (Roman Catholic), formed in 1966, when Contarf parish was divided
 The Parish Churches thereof (see Clontarf parish (Roman Catholic))
 The 1825 chapel
 The current church, finished in the early 1840s